The 1990 Firestone American Racing Series Championship consisted of 14 races. Paul Tracy won nine times and captured seven poles on his way to the championship.

Calendar

Race summaries

Phoenix race
Held April 7 at Phoenix International Raceway. Mark Smith won the pole.

Top Five Results
 Paul Tracy
 Mark Smith
 Éric Bachelart
 Ted Prappas
 Marty Roth

Long Beach race
Held April 22 at Long Beach, California Street Course. Paul Tracy won the pole.

Top Five Results
 Paul Tracy
 Mark Smith
 Tommy Byrne
 Steve Shelton
 Johnny O'Connell

Milwaukee race
Held June 3 at The Milwaukee Mile. Robbie Buhl won the pole.

Top Five Results
 Paul Tracy
 Robbie Buhl
 Robbie Groff
 Ted Prappas
 P. J. Jones

Detroit race
Held June 17 at the Detroit street circuit. Paul Tracy won the pole.

Top Five Results
 Tommy Byrne
 Éric Bachelart
 Mike Snow
 Justin Bell
 Ted Prappas

Portland race
Held June 24 at Portland International Raceway. Paul Tracy won the pole.

Top Five Results
 Paul Tracy
 P. J. Jones
 Mike Snow
 Mitch Thieman
 Ted Prappas

Cleveland race
Held July 8 at Burke Lakefront Airport. Paul Tracy won the pole.

Top Five Results
 Paul Tracy
 P. J. Jones
 Éric Bachelart
 Mark Smith
 Ted Prappas

Meadowlands race
Held July 15 at the Meadowlands Sports Complex. Paul Tracy won the pole.

Top Five Results
 Paul Tracy
 Ted Prappas
 Mike Snow
 Robbie Buhl
 Cathy Muller

Toronto race
Held July 22 at Exhibition Place. Ted Prappas won the pole.

Top Five Results
 Paul Tracy
 Ted Prappas
 P. J. Jones
 Vinicio Salmi
 Cathy Muller

Denver race
Held August 26 at the Denver, Colorado street circuit. P. J. Jones won the pole.

Top Five Results
 Mark Rodrigues
 Robbie Buhl
 Vinicio Salmi
 Marty Roth
 Roberto Quintanilla

Vancouver race
Held September 2 at Pacific Place. Paul Tracy won the pole.

Top Five Results
 Vinicio Salmi
 Mark Smith
 Marty Roth
 Tom Christoff
 Paul Tracy

Mid-Ohio race
Held September 16 at The Mid-Ohio Sports Car Course. Robbie Buhl won the pole.

Top Five Results
 Paul Tracy
 Robbie Buhl
 Robbie Groff
 Tom Christoff
 Mark Rodrigues

Elkhart Lake race
Held September 23 at Road America. Mike Snow won the pole.

Top Five Results
 Paul Tracy
 Robbie Buhl
 Mark Smith
 Éric Bachelart
 Robbie Groff

Nazareth race
Held October 7 at Nazareth Speedway. Robbie Buhl won the pole.

Top Five Results
 Robbie Groff
 Robbie Buhl
 Ted Prappas
 Mark Rodrigues
 Mark Smith

Laguna Seca race
Held October 21 at Mazda Raceway Laguna Seca. Paul Tracy won the pole.

Top Five Results
 Ted Prappas
 Mike Snow
 Robbie Groff
 Vinicio Salmi
 Mark Smith

Final points standings

Driver

For every race the points were awarded: 20 points to the winner, 16 for runner-up, 14 for third place, 12 for fourth place, 10 for fifth place, 8 for sixth place, 6 seventh place, winding down to 1 points for 12th place. Additional points were awarded to the pole winner (1 point) and to the driver leading the most laps (1 point).

Note:

Race 13 not all points were awarded (not enough competitors).

Complete Overview

R15=retired, but classified NS=did not start (11)=place after practice, but grid position not held free

Indy Lights seasons
American Racing Series